The Great Lakes BG was an American carrier-based dive bomber of the 1930s. Designed and built by the Great Lakes Aircraft Company of Cleveland, Ohio, 61 were used by the United States Navy and United States Marine Corps from 1934 to 1940.

Development and design
The Great Lakes Aircraft Company, who had previously built 18 TG-1 and 32 TG-2 variants of the Martin T4M, received an order from the U.S. Navy for a prototype two seat dive bomber capable of carrying a 1,000 lb (454 kg) bomb in 1933. (This compared with contemporary Scout Bombers such as the Vought SBU and the Curtiss SBC Helldiver, also capable of dive bombing, which had  bombloads of 500 lb (227 kg)).

The resulting design was a single engined biplane with single bay, unequal span tapered wings and a fixed tailwheel undercarriage. The aircraft was powered by a  Pratt & Whitney Twin Wasp Junior radial engine.

The prototype XBG-1 was completed in mid-1933 and evaluated against the competing Consolidated XB2Y-1, proving superior. As a result, in November 1933, orders were placed for production of the aircraft as the BG-1, which was fitted with a canopy over the cockpits for the two crew, in place of the open cockpits of the prototype. A total of 61 of these aircraft were built, including the prototype.

Operational history

It was also operated by the Marine Corps, equipping two squadrons from 1935.

The BG-1 continued in front line use with the Navy until 1938, and with the Marines Corps until 1940. It was used for utility duties at shore bases until June 1941. About 22 were converted to target drones for naval anti-aircraft gunnery, with one being used to test TV-guidance for air-to surface missiles, and was successfully guided by signals from a Beechcraft JRB to hit a target raft on Chesapeake Bay on 19 April 1942.

Variants

XBG-1
Prototype. Open cockpit and powered by a Pratt & Whitney R-1535-64 radial engine, one built.
BG-1
Production version with enclosed cockpit and powered by a Pratt & Whitney R-1535-82 radial engine, 60 built.
XB2G-1
Developed version with retractable undercarriage and an enclosed bomb bay. One prototype only.

Operators

United States Marine Corps
VB-4M / VMB-2 - March 1935 to December 1940
VB-6M / VMB-1 - October 1935 to October 1940
VMO-1 - September 1940 to May 1941
VMS-1 - December 1938 to June 1941
VMS-2 - December 1940 to April 1941

United States Navy
VB-3B / VB-4 - November 1934 to June 1939
VB-7 - July 1939 to August 1940

Specifications (BG-1)

See also

References

Notes

Bibliography
 
 
 
 
 The Illustrated Encyclopedia of Aircraft (Part Work 1982-1985), 1985, Orbis Publishing.

External links

Great Lakes Aerofiles.

B01G
Great Lakes BG1
Single-engined tractor aircraft
Biplanes
Carrier-based aircraft
Aircraft first flown in 1933